The Angles were Germanic-speaking people that took their name from the Angeln cultural region in Germany.

Angles may also refer to:

 One of several communes in France:
 Angles, Alpes-de-Haute-Provence
 Angles, Vendée
 Anglès, Tarn
 Les Angles (disambiguation)
 Anglès, Girona, Spain
 Angles (Dan Le Sac Vs Scroobius Pip album), 2008
 Angles (The Strokes album), 2011
 Alan McManus, Scottish professional snooker player
 Plural form of Angle
 "Angles" (song), 2021 song by Wale featuring Chris Brown

See also
Angel (disambiguation)
Angle (disambiguation)